Patricia Ann Hodge, OBE (born 29 September 1946) is an English actress. She is known on-screen for playing Phyllida Erskine-Brown in Rumpole of the Bailey (1978–1992), Jemima Shore in Jemima Shore Investigates (1983), Penny in Miranda (2009–2015) and Mrs Pumphrey in All Creatures Great and Small (2021–present).

Hodge made her West End debut in 1972 and the next year starred in the West End production of Pippin directed by Bob Fosse. Hodge has received two nominations for the Olivier Award for Best Actress in a Musical, and in 2000, she won the Olivier Award for Best Supporting Actress for her role in the play Money.

Her other screen credits include the 1983 film Betrayal, the 1986 TV adaptation of The Life and Loves of a She-Devil, and the TV film Hotel du Lac (1986). For her role in Hotel du Lac, Hodge received a nomination for the BAFTA TV Award for Best Actress.

Early life
Hodge was born in Cleethorpes, Lincolnshire. The daughter of Eric and his wife Marion (née Phillips), the manager and manageress of the Royal Hotel in Grimsby, Hodge attended Wintringham Girls' Grammar School in Weelsby Avenue in Grimsby and then St Helen's School, Northwood, Middlesex, before attending Maria Grey College in Twickenham (later becoming part of Brunel University London), to train as a teacher. She taught English and drama at Russell County Primary School in Chorleywood, Hertfordshire, while also applying to the London Academy of Music and Dramatic Art. She started at LAMDA when she was 22, and was awarded the Eveline Evans Award for Best Actress on graduation.

Career
Hodge made her professional stage debut in the Howard Barker play No-One Was Saved at the Traverse Theatre, Edinburgh in 1971. She made her West End debut in Rookery Nook in 1972, and worked with Bob Fosse in 1973 on Pippin. However, when applying for television work she found she had become classed as a theatre actress. Having made the breakthrough in the role of Phyllida (Trant) Erskine-Brown in Rumpole of the Bailey, she found when trying to make the occasional return to theatre work that she had been classed as a television actress.

She has appeared in roles as diverse as in The Naked Civil Servant opposite John Hurt, shortly after she featured in the BBC's 1975 Christmas production Great Big Groovy Horse, a rock opera based on the story of the Trojan Horse shown on BBC2 starring Julie Covington, Bernard Cribbins and Paul Jones. It was later repeated on BBC1 in 1977. She featured as Myra Arundel in the 1984 BBC version of Noël Coward's Hay Fever, as Margaret Thatcher in The Falklands Play, and in 2007 as Betty, the wife of tycoon Robert Maxwell, in the BBC TV drama Maxwell opposite David Suchet. She took the female lead in the 1983 film, Betrayal (based on Harold Pinter's play Betrayal), a roman à clef derived from the playwright's affair with broadcaster Joan Bakewell.

She was nominated for a BAFTA for her role in a television adaptation of Anita Brookner's Hotel du Lac in 1987, and was awarded the Laurence Olivier Theatre Award in 2000 for Best Supporting Actress for her performance in the production of Money at the National Theatre.

She bought the rights of the book Portrait of a Marriage and is credited with developing a TV series of the same name in association with the BBC in 1990 adapted by writer Penelope Mortimer.

She co-starred with Dame Judi Dench in the 1995 London revival of Stephen Sondheim's A Little Night Music, at the National Theatre, as Countess Charlotte Malcom. In 2003, Hodge featured in His Dark Materials, one of Nicholas Hytner's early productions as its Artistic Director, her third role on the Olivier Theatre stage. 

Hodge is an Honorary Graduate (DLitt) of Brunel University and one of the founder members of the Brunel Club. From 2009 to 2015, she played a comedy role in the BBC sitcom Miranda, as the mother of the eponymous main character. Hodge reprised the role alongside the rest of the cast for the 2017 Royal Variety Performance. In 2012 she toured in Christopher Luscombe's revival of Dandy Dick, starring alongside Nicholas Le Provost.  She is Joint President of Grimsby's Caxton Theatre and a Trustee of LAMDA, her alma mater. 

In 2008, she guest starred in an episode of Hustle within the 4th series, playing the character of Veronica Powell. After the BBC commissioned the show for a 5th series in February 2008, it was planned Hodge would make an additional appearance, however due to on-set filming issues the episode her character would have appeared in was never finished, and subsequently never aired. The release of the 5th series was delayed as a result. 

In 2018, Hodge played Ursula, the mother of Liberal MP and party leader Jeremy Thorpe (played by Hugh Grant) in BBC Television's A Very English Scandal. 

In April 2021, it was announced that Hodge would play the role of Mrs. Pumphrey in the television series All Creatures Great and Small taking over from Diana Rigg who had died the previous year.

Delayed for a year from autumn 2020 due to the Covid-19 pandemic, Hodge was invited by Nigel Havers to star opposite him in Noël Coward's Private Lives, the inaugural production of the Nigel Havers Theatre Company, directed by one of her previous collaborators Christopher Luscombe.

Personal life
Hodge married music publisher Peter Douglas Owen on 31 July 1976 in Tonbridge. The couple had two sons. Douglas died in May 2016, according to Hodge, from heart complications. 

Hodge was appointed Officer of the Order of the British Empire (OBE) in the 2017 Birthday Honours for services to drama.

Filmography

Film

Television

Stage
No-One Was Saved, 1971
Rookery Nook, 1972
Popkiss, 1972
Two Gentlemen of Verona, 1973
Pippin, 1973
Hair, 1974
The Beggar's Opera, 1975
Pal Joey, 1976
Look Back in Anger, 1976
Then and Now, 1979
The Mitford Girls, 1981
As You Like It, 1983
Benefactors, 1984
Lady in the Dark, 1988
Noël and Gertie, 1989–90
Shades, 1992
Separate Tables, 1993
The Prime of Miss Jean Brodie, 1994
A Little Night Music, 1995
Money, 1999–2000
Summerfolk, 1999–2000
Noises Off, 2000–01
His Dark Materials, 2003–04
Dream Me a Winter, 2006 (part of the Old Vic's '24 Hour Plays')
Boeing Boeing, 2007
The Country Wife, 2007–08
The Clean House, 2008
Calendar Girls, 2008–09
The Breath of Life, 2011
Dandy Dick, 2012
Relative Values, 2013–14
Travels with My Aunt, 2016
Copenhagen, 2018
A Day in the Death of Joe Egg, 2019
Private Lives, 2021–22
Watch on the Rhine, 2022–23

Awards and nominations

References

External links
 

1946 births
Living people
People from Cleethorpes
Laurence Olivier Award winners
Alumni of the London Academy of Music and Dramatic Art
People educated at St Helen's School
English film actresses
English stage actresses
English television actresses
Actresses from Lincolnshire
20th-century English actresses
21st-century English actresses
Officers of the Order of the British Empire